Epaena complicatalis is a species of moth of the  family Thyrididae. It is found in Sumatra, West Malaysia, Brunei, Borneo (Sabah, Sarawak), Kalimantan Timur in lowland to upper montane forest at altitudes of about 1700 m.

The fasciation of this medium-sized (22–38 mm) species is distinctive and not very variable.

External links
An Illustrated Guide to the Thyridid Moths of Borneo

Moths described in 1858
Thyrididae
Moths of Borneo